A crupellarius (pl. Crupellarii) was a type of heavy armored gladiator during the Roman Imperial age, whose origin was Gaul.

Equipment and style 

The standard crupellarius was clad almost entirely from head to foot in lorica segmentata or laminar armour, which consisted of strips of malleable iron that was layered. Other variations of this armor were similar to manica. The crupellarius carried a scutum and gladius; the shield was most likely either oval, rectangular or circular. These shields were usually made of wood in a laminate type structure and bound in leather strips, durable enough to deflect sword strikes and projectiles but also light enough to be held in tow with just one arm.

Crupellarii wore a helmet resembling a perforated bucket, with only very small openings for the eyes and mouth, similar to a medieval Great helm, which resulted in poor visual acuity in battle. Iron was incorporated more due to how simple it was to produce however bronze fittings were more prone to being corroded as well as leather bindings which had a tendency to tether and rot over time. This style of armor was most popular during the Principate and seems to have been used sporadically after the 3rd century CE.

Thus, the crupellarius' fighting style was suited for men with a large muscular build, able to withstand the weight of the heavy plate armor he wore, as he was one of the most heavily encumbered gladiators with the amount of layered plated iron (especially given the absence of gauntlets and sabatons). The crupellarius are more defense orientated, depending on his stamina and endurance to survive the battle, tiring out attacking foes before counterattacking them when they are worn out. This can explain as to why their armor is heavily layered hence having limited movement speed as well as clad in a helmet that would have obstructed most of their vision due to the very small openings in the helmet.

In literature 

Crupellarii were first mentioned by the 1st century AD historian Tacitus. Under the reign of the 2nd Roman Emperor, Tiberius, a faction of Treveri led by Julius Florus, and the Aedui, led by Julius Sacrovir, led a rebellion of Gaulish debtors against the Romans in 21 CE. The crupellarii, heavily armoured Gallic gladiators, fought against Roman legionaries.
In addition were some slaves who were being trained for gladiators, clad after the national fashion in a complete covering of steel. They were called crupellarii, and though they were ill-adapted for inflicting wounds, they were impenetrable to them...
...the cavalry threw itself on the flanks, and the infantry charged the van. On the wings there was but a brief resistance. The men in mail were somewhat of an obstacle, as the iron plates did not yield to javelins or swords; but our men, snatching up hatchets and pickaxes, hacked at their bodies and their armour as if they were battering a wall. Some beat down the unwieldy mass with pikes and forked poles, and they were left lying on the ground, without an effort to rise, like dead men.

Class rank 
Although not much is known about their extensive arena presence, crupellarius gladiators most likely belonged to a class called laquearius

See also 
 List of Roman gladiator types

References 

Gladiator types